Telfords Bus & Coach, formerly branded Telford's, was an Australian bus company operating charter services in Sydney. As of late 2022, Telfords Bus & Coach has changed its name as part of a business re-brand by the parent company, Kinetic. The company has now been dissolved into the Kinetic brand with its fleet of buses reflecting this change.

History

In 1973, Marrickville Bus Lines was purchased by Max Holman from Barry Barton. In May 1977, the business was sold to Bob Wood and renamed Orana Tours. In January 1978, the business was purchased by Benny Rachwal and resumed trading as Marrickville Bus Lines. One route was operated, 222 Dulwich Hill to Sydenham.

In January 1989, Marrickville commenced operating five routes in the White Bay/Bondi Junction/Marrickville areas on an interim basis after the collapse of ABC Coachlines. These were taken over by Arrow Coaches in April 1989. Marrickville also commenced providing buses for The Scots College. This segment of the business would grow rapidly, with Marrickville winning work from many Eastern Suburbs and Inner West schools.

In the 1980s, Marrickville purchased the business of Telford Educational Tours. Having been renumbered to 448 in November 1987, the remaining route was taken over by Sydney Buses in January 2004 and ceased soon afterward.

In October 2013, Benny Rachwald died with the business passing to his sons, Robert and James. In May 2014, Telfords was sold to Dunn Motor Traction.

On 1 May 2015, the Tiger Tours business at Taren Point was purchased with 11 vehicles, and has since been fully merged into the Telford operation.

In November 2019, the business was sold to Kinetic Group following the cessation of the Yourbus (Dunn Motor Traction LTD) business in the United Kingdom.

In late 2022, Telfords Bus and Coach was officially branded as KINETIC with all new advertising now showing the Kinetic Brand. All new buses will display the Kinetic logo with the current fleet of Surfside Buses slowly being updated to reflect the new brand name. The current website for Telfords will stay active until early 2023 before it will be deactivated, directing customers to the new Kinetic website.

Services
Telfords operated services from Macquarie Park to Epping station under contract to Optus and from Sydney Olympic Park to Lidcombe station, Strathfield station and the Sydney central business district under contract to the Commonwealth Bank. It also operates school buses for various Eastern Suburbs and Inner West schools.

On 23 March 2015, Telfords commenced operating an express commuter service from Rouse Hill to the Sydney CBD under the Your Commute brand. This was previously operated by Bankstown Coaches as the Bullet Bus until November 2014.

Fleet
As at July 2015, the fleet consisted of 94 buses and coaches. Fleet livery is white, red and grey.

References

External links

Company website
Bus Australia gallery

Bus companies of New South Wales
Bus transport in Sydney
Kinetic Group companies